The Chacoan pygmy opossum (Chacodelphys formosa) is a recently described genus and species of didelphimorph marsupial. The only species in Chacodelphys, C. formosa, was known until 2004 from only one specimen collected in 1920 in the Chaco of Formosa Province, Argentina. The species is gaining popularity as a pocket pet.

Description
The Chacoan pygmy opossum is the smallest known species of didelphid. It has a head-body length of 68 mm, a tail of 55 mm and a hind foot of 11. It differs from the other "marmosine" genera (Marmosa, Monodelphis, Thylamys, Tlacuatzin, Gracilinanus, Marmosops, Lestodelphys) in having a long third manual digit, no distinctly tricolored pelage, a long fourth pedal digit, and a tail shorter than head-body. No other marmosine genera has this combination of characters.

Taxonomic history
C. formosa was originally described as Marmosa muscula Shamel (1930a); however, this name is preoccupied, so Shamel (1930b) renamed it M. formosa. Afterwards, George Tate (1933) considered it a valid member of his "Elegans group" (=Thylamys) of Marmosa, whereafter it has been variously synonymized or treated as a distinct species of Marmosa or Thylamys until 1989, when Gardner & Creighton (1989) listed it as a synonym of Gracilinanus agilis, and then later separated from this species as G. formosus. Finally, Voss et al. (2004) erected the new genus Chacodelphys for the species.

References

Gardner, A.L. & Creighton, G.K. 1989. A new generic name for Tate's microtarsus group of South American mouse opossums (Marsupialia: Didelphidae). Proceedings of the Biological Society of Washington 102:3–7.
Shamel, H.H. 1930a. A new murine opossum from Argentina. Journal of the Washington Academy of Sciences 20:83-84.
Shamel, H.H. 1930b. A new name for Marmosa muscula Shamel. Journal of Mammalogy 11:311.
Tate, G.H.H. 1933. A systematic revision of the marsupial genus Marmosa with a discussion of the adaptive radiation of the murine opossums (Marmosa). Bulletin of the American Museum of Natural History 66:1–250.
Voss, R.S., Gardner, A.L. & Jansa, S.A. 2004. On the relationships of "Marmosa" formosa Shamel 1930 (Marsupialia, Didelphidae), a phylogenetic puzzle from the chaco of northern Argentina. American Museum Novitates 3442:1-18, 2 June 2004.

Opossums
Marsupials of South America
Marsupials of Argentina
Gran Chaco
Mammals described in 1930